Take Me to Paris is a 1951 British comedy film directed by Jack Raymond and starring Albert Modley, Roberta Huby and Bruce Seton. It was made at Walton Studios.

Plot
Mr. Armstrong's racing  stable is preparing to send one of its top horses to run in Paris's Maisons Lafitte, when the thoroughbred is unexpectedly injured. Its replacement is Thunderhead, a much lowlier animal, but favourite of jockey and stable lad, Albert. Meanwhile, two crooked stable hands plot to use the cross channel trip to smuggle forged bank notes in the horse's blanket. Their plans are foiled however, by Albert, who also manages to win the big race riding his favourite horse.

Cast
 Albert Modley as Albert  
 Roberta Huby as Linda Vane  
 Bruce Seton as Gerald Vane 
 Claire Guibert as Annette  
 Richard Molinas as Pojo 
 Alfred Argus as Jules  
 Lottie Beck as Danseuse 
 George Bishop as Mr. Armstrong  
 Paul Bonifas as the Bistro Keeper (Cafe Proprietor) 
 Jim Gérald as Butcher  
 Gerald Rex as Gendarme 
 Leonard Sharp as Walter  
 Marc Valbel as Maurice

References

Bibliography
 Chibnall, Steve & McFarlane, Brian. The British 'B' Film. Palgrave MacMillan, 2009.

External links

1951 films
British comedy films
1951 comedy films
Films directed by Jack Raymond
Films shot at Nettlefold Studios
British black-and-white films
Films scored by Percival Mackey
1950s English-language films
1950s British films